Zagreb bypass is a U-shaped motorway partially encircling Zagreb, Croatia. The largest part by far, between Jankomir and Ivanja Reka interchanges, was built between 1977 and 1979, while the Ivanja Reka – Sveta Helena section was built between 1996 and 1999. The bypass crosses the Sava River twice and comprises a bridge across the Sava-Odra floodwater overflow canal. As the busiest sections between Jankomir and Buzin interchanges carry traffic volume of approximately 45,000 AADT, it is the most heavily used motorway sector in Croatia.

Zagreb bypass is not designated as a separate motorway with a distinct motorway number, rather it consists of sections of three motorways:

Those motorway sections are concurrent with sections of the D1 and D3 state roads as well as European routes E59, E65, E70 and E71.

The bypass currently comprises four traffic lanes along its entire length, with an emergency lane in each direction. In its current form, the Zagreb bypass has a small number of interchanges spaced widely apart. The last new interchange was built in 2007–2008 at Kosnica in the southeast, to connect the Homeland Bridge and Zagreb via Radnička cesta (Ž1029).

There are two rest areas along the bypass: Lučko rest area is located between Jankomir and Lučko interchanges comprising famous Plitvice Motel, well known for its pedestrian bridge across the bypass, while Sesvete rest area is located between Popovec and Sveta Helena interchanges. A new rest area is planned between Jakuševec and Kosnica interchanges.

Future expansion

A proposal has been made in 2007 for a new interchange near Zaprešić, one that would reduce traveling time between the cities.

As a part of the A11 motorway construction works, a new Jakuševec interchange was built east of the Buzin interchange. The Buzin interchange in turn is planned to be abolished, in favor of another new interchange, Sveta Klara, further to the west.

A long-term plan exists to build a new outer bypass road around Zagreb. A total of 14 interchanges are planned on the new bypass, including the ones connecting it to the other motorways already specified, connecting the outer bypass to all major roads intersected.

Because of the Medvednica Mountain north of Zagreb, the present bypass is U-shaped, leaving the city without a northern bypass that would connect the A2 and A4 highways. A northern branch (around 27 km long) of the bypass was planned and designed to bridge the gap. It was planned to connect the Zaprešić interchange with the Popovec interchange. The route would have required a number of long tunnels and viaducts making it expensive. According to the general design alternative in a study executed by the Faculty of Architecture and Institut IGH, the route would comprise 15 tunnels. The tunnels longer than 500 m would be: Ivanec Tunnel (2656 m), Borčec Tunnel (1797 m), Pantovčak Tunnel (1625 m), Dotrščina Tunnel (1050 m), Remete 1 Tunnel (1025 m), Čuguvec Tunnel (550 m) and Novaki Tunnel (502 m). The construction works were planned in stages with an additional 5–10 km long tunnel built subsequently through Medvednica Mountain to connect Zagreb and Hrvatsko zagorje directly. However, as of September 2011, all such plans were cancelled as unfeasible.

Croatian Motorways has started the realization of the project of building the third lane on the Zagreb bypass. Thus, HAC and the consortium led by the IGH Institute signed a contract for the development of a preliminary design, environmental impact assessment and obtaining a location permit for the reconstruction of the Zagreb bypass from Jankomir to Ivanja Reka by upgrading the third lane and for the main and detailed design and obtaining a building permit, for the busiest section, Jankomir - Lučko. The estimated value of the investment for the expansion of the entire bypass is around HRK 800 million, and the exact amount will be known after the development of the preliminary design. Construction could begin in 2023.

Exit list

{| class="wikitable"
|-
!scope="col"|County
!scope="col"|km
!scope="col"|Exit
!scope="col"|Name
!scope="col"|Destination
!scope="col"|Notes
|-
| rowspan= 2|Zagreb
| 0.0
| align=center | 6
| Zaprešić
| 
| Connection to Zaprešić and Zagreb via Aleja Bologne and Ilica.The westernmost interchange of the Zagreb bypass.Westbound traffic continues along the northbound A2 motorway towards Krapina and Maribor, Slovenia. The D1 road is not physically signposted along the Zagreb bypass.
|-
| 2.9
| colspan=4 align=center |Sava River Bridge
|-
| rowspan= 6|City of Zagreb
| 7.4
| align=center | 7/3
| Jankomir
| 
| Connection to the A3 motorway (E70) (connecting Samobor and Ljubljana, Slovenia to the west) and to Zagreb via the Ž1035 road.The southern terminus of the European route E59.For the eastbound traffic the exit is signposted as A2 exit number 7, and for the westbound traffic the exit is signposted as A3 exit number 3.The Zagreb bypass switches between the A2 (to the west) and the A3 (to the east) at this point.
|-
| 10.9
| align=center |
| colspan=3 |Plitvice rest area
|-
| 12.3
| align=center | 4/1
| Lučko
| 
| Connection to A1 motorway and to the City of Zagreb via Jadranska Avenue.The western terminus of European routes E65/E71 concurrency.The eastern terminus of the D1 state road concurrency and the western terminus of D3 state road concurrency; the state roads are not signposted along the Zagreb bypass.
|-
| bgcolor=#ffdead |19.0
| bgcolor=#ffdead align=center | 4a
| bgcolor=#ffdead |Sveta Klara
| bgcolor=#ffdead nowrap=yes|
| bgcolor=#ffdead |A planned connection to the City of Zagreb via Novi Zagreb and Većeslava Holjevca Avenue
|-
| 21.1
| align=center | 5
| Buzin
| 
| Connection to the City of Zagreb via Savezne Republike Njemačke Street and Novi Zagreb, Zagreb airport and to Velika Gorica
|-
| bgcolor=#ffdddd |22.1
| bgcolor=#ffdddd align=center | 5b
| bgcolor=#ffdddd |Jakuševec
| bgcolor=#ffdddd |
| bgcolor=#ffdddd |Interchange to the A11 motorway (under construction), providing connections to Zagreb via Sarajevska Road and to Velika Gorica. As of 2017, the interchange is fully built, but access to and from the north end is impossible as the interchange has not yet been connected to Sarajevska Road.
|-
| rowspan= 3|Zagreb
| 29.3
| align=center | 5a
| Kosnica
| 
| Connection to the City of Zagreb via Radnička Road (Ž1029 to the north) and to Velika Gorica and Zagreb Airport (D31 to the south; the southern ramp under construction as of October 2010) 
|-
| 33.4
| colspan=4 align=center|Sava River Bridge
|-
| 34.1
| align=center | 6/12
| Ivanja Reka
| 
| Connection to the A3 motorway leading east towards Slavonski Brod and Osijek. Connection to the City of Zagreb via Ž1035.The eastern terminus of European route E70 concurrency.For the westbound traffic the exit is signposted as A4 exit number 12, and for the eastbound traffic the exit is signposted as A3 exit number 6.The Zagreb bypass switches between the A3 (to the west) and the A4 (to the east) at this point.
|-
| rowspan=3 |City of Zagreb
| 34.9
| style="text-align:center;"| 11
| Kraljevečki Novaki
| 
| Connection to Sesvete and Dugo Selo
|-
| 38.1
| text-align:center;"| 10
| Popovec
| 
| Connection to Popovec and Soblinec (D29)The northern terminus of concurrency of the A4 motorway and the D3 state road.The D3 road is not physically signposted along the Zagreb bypass.
|-
| 42.0
| align=center |
| colspan=3 |Sesvete rest area
|-
| Zagreb
| 48.9
| align=center | 9
| Sveta Helena
| 
| Connection to Vrbovec and Križevci via D10 expressway.Connection to Rakovec, Sveta Helena and Donja Zelina (D3) (via the Ž3016)The easternmost interchange of the Zagreb bypass. The eastbound traffic defaults to the northbound A4.

Incidents 

On September 29, 2021, highway patrol workers noticed increased vibrations on the Sava River Bridge between Jankomir and Zaprešić interchanges along the bypass. The preliminary investigation has shown that one of the bearings of the bridge on the abutment was damaged. The section of the bypass between Jankomir and Zaprešić interchange has been closed for traffic, causing large traffic jams throughout Zagreb.

See also 

 Hrvatske autoceste
 Autocesta Zagreb - Macelj

References 

Roads in Zagreb
Ring roads
Motorways in Croatia
Bypasses